Snapshot of a Beginner is the fourth studio album by Canadian indie rock band Nap Eyes. It was released on March 27, 2020, by Jagjaguwar.

Critical reception

Snapshot of a Beginner was met with generally favorable reviews from critics. At Metacritic, which assigns a weighted average rating out of 100 to reviews from mainstream publications, this release received an average score of 76, based on 10 reviews.

Track listing

Personnel
Adapted from Discogs
 Nigel Chapman - vocals
 Joshua Salter - bass guitar
 Seamus Dalton - drums
 Brad Loughead - guitar
 Jonathan Low - keyboard, producer
 James Elkington - piano, guitar, producer

References

2020 albums
Jagjaguwar albums